Marián Studenič (born 28 October 1998) is a Slovak professional ice hockey winger for the Texas Stars of the American Hockey League (AHL) as a prospect under contract to the Dallas Stars of the National Hockey League (NHL). He was drafted in the fifth round (143rd overall) in the 2017 NHL Entry Draft by the New Jersey Devils.

Playing career
Studenič played as a youth within hometown team, HK 36 Skalica. He made his professional debut with the club during the 2014–15 season in the Slovak Extraliga.

After two seasons in the Slovak League, Studenič moved to North America to develop his game at the major junior level. He was selected 11th overall in the 2016 OHL Import Draft by the Hamilton Bulldogs of the Ontario Hockey League (OHL).

Following a successful rookie campaign with the Bulldogs in the 2016–17 season, recording 18 goals in 58 games, Studenič was selected in the fifth-round, 143rd overall, by the New Jersey Devils in the 2017 NHL Entry Draft. He was ranked 101 overall for North American skaters by the NHL Central Scouting Bureau.

On 2 April 2018, Studenič signed a three-year, entry-level contract with the New Jersey Devils. After attending the Devils training camp, Studenič was assigned to their American Hockey League (AHL) affiliate, the Binghamton Devils, for the 2018–19 season. Studenič made his AHL debut on 7 October 2018 against the Toronto Marlies where he also scored his first AHL goal.

On 13 August 2020, Studenič was assigned by the Devils to HC Slovan Bratislava of the Slovak Extraliga on loan until the commencement of the delayed 2020–21 North American season. He scored his first NHL goal against the New York Rangers on 18 April 2021.

In the following 2021–22 season, Studenič split the season between New Jersey and new AHL affiliate, the Utica Comets, registering just one goal through 17 games with the Devils. On 24 January 2022, Studenič's tenure with the Devils ended as he was claimed off waivers by the Dallas Stars.

International play
On 19 April 2019, Studenič made his senior national team debut in Euro Hockey Challenge match against Austria. Three minutes into the first period he scored his first senior national team goal in his first shift of the match.

Career statistics

Regular season and playoffs

International

References

External links
 
 

1998 births
Living people
Binghamton Devils players
Dallas Stars players
HC Slovan Bratislava players
HK 36 Skalica players
HK Dukla Trenčín players
Hamilton Bulldogs (OHL) players
New Jersey Devils draft picks
New Jersey Devils players
People from Skalica District
Sportspeople from the Trnava Region
Slovak ice hockey right wingers
Texas Stars players
Utica Comets players
Slovak expatriate ice hockey players in the United States
Slovak expatriate ice hockey players in Canada